Shim Sang-ho is a South Korean businessman. He served as an elected volunteer member of the Asia-Pacific Regional Scout Committee of the World Organization of the Scout Movement (WOSM) from 2009 to 2015, chairperson of the Young Adult Members Group.

References

External links

https://scout.org/user/60948/about
http://english.scout.or.kr/BoaFileUtil.do?action=download&filepath.../notice/...6..._New_Chief_and_International_Commissioner.pdf
https://issuu.com/worldscouting/docs/6th_issue_january_2013

Scouting in South Korea
Living people
South Korean businesspeople
1959 births